Tomima Edmark (born 1957 in Seattle, Wash.) is an American entrepreneur, author, and inventor of TopsyTail, Halo Hat and Bowrette. She is the founder of HerRoom and HisRoom, an online lingerie and men's underwear retailer based in Dallas, Texas.

Education
Edmark earned a BFA and BA degree from Stephens College in Columbia, Missouri in 1979 and then she attended The University of Texas at Austin where she completed an MBA degree in 1983.

Career
In 1984, after receiving her MBA, she worked with IBM as marketing executive in Dallas, before leaving in 1992.

In 1989 Edmark filed for TopsyTail patent, received in April 1991 and established TopsyTail Corp. to market and sell the product. TopsyTail earned more than $150 million in revenue.

In 1994 Edmark introduced the Bowrette, a barrette patterned after the TopsyTail that turns ribbons and scarves into hair ornaments.

In 1998, Edmark began an e-commerce retail start-up The Andra Group, LP. She launched HerRoom on March 3, 2000 and the men’s site, HisRoom.com was launched two years later. After listening to her friends' complaints that they hated having to try on undergarments in department store fitting rooms, she wanted to let women buy bras that fit online.

In 2011, Edmark was awarded business method patent #8,078,498 for using back and side views as well as the front.

Edmark has been featured on television shows like Good Morning America, Dateline NBC, 20/20, The Oprah Winfrey Show and in business publications like Forbes Magazine, and The Wall Street Journal.

Books
 Edmark, Tomima (1991). Kissing : everything you ever wanted to know. New York: Simon & Schuster. .
 Edmark, Tomima (1993). 365 ways to kiss your love : a daily guide to creative kissing. Fort Worth, Tx.: Summit Group. .
 Edmark, Tomima (1994). The TopsyTail book : the guide to dozens of easy-to-do, quick and fabulous hairstyles. New York: Warner Books. .
 Edmark, Tomima (1995). Cigar chic : a woman's perspective. Arlington, TX: Summit Publishing Group. .
 Edmark, Tomima (1995). 365 ways to date your love : a daily guide to creative romance. Fort Worth, Tex.: Summit Pub. Group. .
 Edmark, Tomima (1996). The kissing book : everything you need to know. Arlington, Tex.: Summit Pub. Group. .
 Edmark, Tomima (1996). 365 romantic gifts for your love : a daily guide to creative giving. Arlington, Tex.: Summit Pub. Group. .
 Edmark, Tomima (1997). 365 Ways to Date Your Love. Tapestry Press. p. 120. .
 Edmark, Tomima (1997). 365 Romantic Gifts for Your Love: A Daily Guide to Creative Giving. Tapestry Press. .
 Edmark, Tomima (1997). The Kissing Book: Everything You Need to Know. Tapestry Press. p. 128. .
 Edmark, Tomima (2001). It's a girl thing : more than 300 qualities, quirks, & quibbles that uniquely define women. Nashville, TN: TowleHouse Pub. .
 Edmark, Tomima (2001). It's a guy thing : more than 300 tics, traits, and tendencies that uniquely define men. Nashville, Tenn.: TowleHouse Pub.

References

External links
 
 Patents by Inventor Tomima L. Edmark

1957 births
Living people
20th-century American inventors
21st-century American inventors
American women in business
American women writers
Businesspeople from Seattle
Stephens College alumni
McCombs School of Business alumni
Women inventors
21st-century American women